MBTA Green Line Type 8 is a light rail vehicle that was built by Breda (merged into AnsaldoBreda during production, now Hitachi Rail Italy) for the Massachusetts Bay Transit Authority (MBTA). The cars were constructed from 1998-2007 and replaced all remaining Boeing LRVs. They were built to have a low-floor section to allow for accessibility by all. As of 2018, most cars are coupled to one Kinki Sharyo Type 7 in regular service to create a two-car train with one accessible car. They run on all branches of the Green Line. The MBTA currently runs 92 out of 95 Type 8 vehicles, numbered 3800 to 3894. They are maintained at the Reservoir and Riverside carhouses.

History 
In 1996, the MBTA requested Breda make 100 new cars for the Green Line. The MBTA started running these cars in 1999, but they were very prone to derailment because of an incorrectly sized wheel axle and had to be taken out of service before returning in 2006. This delayed the retirement of the Boeing LRVs by several years. According to MBTA Chief Operating Officer Jeff Gonneville, they present a "maintenance challenge". They started tethering the Type 7s and Type 8s together to work with each other and making the wheels on the cars the same as the Kinki Sharyo Type 7s.

In March 1998, car numbers 3800 to 3802 were delivered and started testing in summer 1998 on the Riverside branch, then they went into service in March 1999. However the trains were removed from service several times, first time from August 2000 to June 2001, out of service completely in 2002, and eventually returning to service on the B branch in May 2003 following a derailment caused by axle size issues. 

The vehicles were first used in regular service on the B, C, and E branches. This is because these branches run in street medians or mixed traffic, generally operating at low speeds, while most problems with these cars happened at high speeds. The D branch, which is a grade-separated right-of-way, allows trains to reach higher speeds of 40 to 50 mph; therefore these cars were unable to run on the D branch until the tracks were fully rehabilitated in Summer 2007. Since then, Type 8 cars have run on all 4 branches of the Green Line since December 1, 2008.

In May 2008, the A end of car number 3879 was severely damaged from a derailment and eventually was stored at the Riverside yard until 2013. In January 2013, 3879 was fixed but was permanently retired and was moved to the new training facility in Broadway where it got preserved for training employees. 

In October 2016, the Boston Globe reported that the MBTA Green Line had the most derailments in the nation because of this train model.

As of December 2019, car numbers 3847 and 3854 were withdrawn following damages and are now stored for parts.

Features 
Features include automated announcements, next stop signs, 75% low floor accessibility for wheelchairs, and white interior walls. The automated announcements and next stop signs were also retrofitted onto the Kinki Sharyo Type 7s. Like the rest of the MBTA system, the pre-recorded announcements were made by the voice of Frank Oglesby, Jr. These cars use similar traction motors to those used in the New York City Subway's R142A, R188 and R143 trains, as well as the original fleet (CQ31x) of the MARTA rail network in Atlanta.

References 

Light rail vehicles
Green Line (MBTA)
Electric multiple units of the United States
Breda multiple units
AnsaldoBreda multiple units
Breda trams
AnsaldoBreda trams
600 V DC multiple units